Basilica of San Francesco may refer to:

 Basilica of San Francesco d'Assisi, another name for Basilica of Saint Francis of Assisi
 Basilica of San Francesco, Bologna
 Basilica of San Francesco, Arezzo
 Basilica of San Francesco, Siena
 Basilica di San Francesco alla Rocca, another name for San Francesco, Viterbo
 Basilica of San Francesco, Ravenna

See also
Basílica de San Francisco (disambiguation)